Worthington R. Patterson Jr. (born June 17, 1931) is an American former basketball player who played for the UConn Huskies college basketball team and the St. Louis Hawks of the National Basketball Association (NBA), becoming the first UConn alumnus to play in an NBA game. After his basketball career, Patterson worked as a music executive.

Early life
Patterson was born on June 17, 1931 in New Haven, Connecticut. He was introduced to basketball at the Boys Club in Greenwich, Connecticut. He attended Greenwich High School from 1946 to 1950 and then spent one year at The Tilton School, where he played for Coach Weldon Haire.

College career
Patterson played guard for the UConn Huskies from 1951 to 1954. During that time he was named first team All-Yankee Conference twice (1952–53 and 1953–54) and helped lead the team to three consecutive Yankee Conference Championships and an appearance in the 1954 NCAA Men's Division I Basketball Tournament. He played for coach Hugh Greer. Patterson would become the first UConn alumnus to play in an NBA game.

Professional career
Patterson dropped out of college a semester before graduation in order to sign with the Boston Celtics, shortly before the start of training camp in 1954. He was waived by the team two days before the start of the regular season. After he was cut, Patterson returned to UConn and earned his bachelor's degree in physical education.

After graduating, Patterson, who was a member of the Reserve Officers' Training Corps in college, enlisted in the United States Army. He served two years in the Army and was stationed at Fort Sill. While at Fort Sill, he was an officer and played on the base basketball team.

In 1957, Patterson returned to professional basketball as a member of the St. Louis Hawks. He was the only African-American player in camp that year. His first NBA game, against the Celtics, took place on October 22, 1957. He was released after three months with the team, during which time he played in 4 games, scoring 7 points in 13 minutes of play. The Hawks became the last team to win the season without an African American player on its playoff roster.

After his release, Patterson worked in the Hawks' front office for 4–6 weeks as part of the team's effort to integrate. He spent the 1958–59 and 1959–60 seasons with the Scranton Miners of the Eastern Basketball Association.

Music executive
After retiring from basketball, Patterson worked as a salesman. He spent six years at Technical Tape Corporation, working as a sales trainee, assistant to the Vice President of Sales, assistant to the General Manager, and assistant to the Purchasing Agent.

Patterson left Technical Tape Corporation for RCA, where he worked at an RCA Records factory before becoming a salesman in the New England territory. He was later transferred to the company's promotions office in New York City. He then spent five years with Warner Bros. Records.

In 1969, he was appointed manager of artist relations east at Dot Records.

In 1970, he returned to RCA as head of promotions. Among the acts at RCA at this time were Hall & Oates, Waylon Jennings, and Vickie Sue Robinson.

Later that year, he moved to Chess Records, where he was named national promotions director. In 1971, Patterson was promoted to Sales Director.

In 1972, Patterson became Eastern district sales manager for Warner/Reprise Records. In 1973, he joined Warner Brothers’ subsidiary Casablanca Records, where he was charge of promotions for the new label. Casablanca's acts included Kiss, Donna Summer, The Village People, and Toni Tennille.

He later moved to Motown, where he worked for eight years in sales and promotions.

He worked at Bertelsmann Music Group for eight months in 1991 before retiring.

He came out of retirement in the mid-1990s to serve as vice president of marketing and promotion for Monad Records.

Personal life
Patterson and his wife Queen have two children, Worthy III and Tanya. Worthy III played basketball at Pepperdine University.

References

1931 births
Living people
University of Connecticut alumni
American men's basketball players
American military sports players
American music industry executives
Basketball players from Connecticut
Greenwich High School alumni
Guards (basketball)
Sportspeople from Greenwich, Connecticut
St. Louis Hawks players
UConn Huskies men's basketball players
Undrafted National Basketball Association players
United States Army officers
Scranton Miners (basketball) players
Basketball players from New Haven, Connecticut
Tilton School alumni